South Kivu is one of 26 provinces of the Democratic Republic of the Congo. Its capital is Bukavu.

History
South Kivu Province was created from Sud-Kivu District in 1989, when the existing Kivu Province was divided into three parts (South Kivu, North Kivu and Maniema).

In June 2014, around 35 people were killed in an attack in the South Kivu village of Mutarule. The attack was apparently part of dispute over cattle.

One policeman was killed.

Approximate correspondence between historical and current province

Geography
South Kivu borders the provinces of North Kivu to the north, Maniema to the west, and Katanga to the south.  To the east it borders the countries of Rwanda, Burundi, and Tanzania.

Administrative organization
Administratively, the province of Sud-Kivu is divided into the capital city of Bukavu and the eight territories: 
 Fizi (15,788 km²), capital Fizi town; 
 Idjwi (281 km²), this is an island in Lake Kivu; 
 Kabare (1,960 km²), 
 Kalehe (5,126 km²),
 Mwenga (11,172 km²),
 Shabunda (25,116 km²),
 Uvira (3,148 km²), capital Uvira town; 
 Walungu (1,800 km²),

Cities
In the legal view, this province has three major cities of importance: Baraka (Fizi Territory), Bukavu (Provincial Capital) and Uvira (Uvira Territory). The northern city of Minova grew exponentially from 1994 through 2012 with a steady influx of refugees as a result of the disruption of the Rwandan genocide and the First and Second Congo wars, and continued fighting in the area.

The city of Bukavu has experienced an exponential urban growth since colonial times. Sadiki et al. (2010) report about 620,000 inhabitants for 2008. The population growth rate increased incredibly in 2002 due to the entry of massive population from Goma after the Nyiragongo eruption of 17 January 2002.

Towns and villages 

 Luberizi
 Mutarule

Health districts
South Kivu is divided into 34 health zones (zones de santé). These are grouped into five health districts (districts de santé). These districts do not match the geography of the territories.

War and human rights
The Banyamulenge, the term historically describing the ethnic Tutsi Rwandans (Banyarwanda) concentrated on the Itombwe Plateau of the province, have been the focus of much controversy. The ambiguous political and social position of the Banyamulenge has been a point of contention in the province in the wake of incursion by fleeing Interahamwe forces responsible for the genocide of Rwandan Tutsis into the Kivu region after the liberation of neighboring Rwanda by the Tutsi-led Rwandan Patriotic Front, leading to the Banyamulenge playing a key role in the run-up to the First Congo War in 1996–1997 and Second Congo War of 1998–2003. South Kivu, along with North Kivu, has been the center of the conflict, which followed the Second Congo War.

The UN estimates that in 2005, approximately 45,000 women were raped in South Kivu. It forms the new Congolese military (FARDC's) 10th Military Region, under General Pacifique Masunzu, whose undisciplined former factional fighters are responsible for many continuing human rights abuses, due to a continuing culture of impunity for military personnel, challenging physical living conditions, lack of pay, and lack of training.

Masunzu is a Banyamulenge (South Kivu Banyamulenge Tutsi) who broke with the Rwandan-backed Rally for Congolese Democracy (RCD) back in 2003. He was formerly commander of the 122nd Brigade in the Minembwe area, who in 2005 rebelled against the authorities in defence of the Congolese Banyamulenge, against harassment and physical abuse. Also previously former second in command of 4th Military Region in Kasai-Occidental. Africa Confidential said in 2011 that he 'clearly remains implacably opposed to the Rwandan government.' His deputy Colonel Baudouin Nakabaka is a former Mai-Mai fighter with close links to the FDLR.

In July 2007, United Nations human rights expert Yakin Erturk called the situation in South Kivu the worst she has ever seen in four years as the global body's special investigator for violence against women. Sexual violence throughout Congo is "rampant," she said, blaming rebel groups, the armed forces and national police.  Her statement included that "Frequently women are shot or stabbed in their genital organs, after they are raped. Women, who survived months of enslavement, told me that their tormentors had forced them to eat excrement or the human flesh of murdered relatives."

Mutarule massacre left thousand of people homeless and killed about 30 persons on 26 June 2014

References

Further reading 
"Rape Epidemic Raises Trauma of Congo War." By Jeffrey Gettleman. October 7, 2007. New York Times
Retracing Che Guevara's Congo Footsteps by BBC News, November 25, 2004

External links
  

 
Provinces of the Democratic Republic of the Congo